The winners and nominees of the Asia Pacific Screen Award for Best Documentary Feature Film

2000s

2010s

External links

Documentary Feature Film
Documentary film awards
Lists of films by award